The Escuela Nacional de Artes Plásticas "Rafael Rodríguez Padilla" (National School of Plastic Arts) (ENAP), based in Guatemala City, is a public institution of higher education, research, and professional education in academic and applied fine arts of painting, sculpture, and graphic design.

Brief history 
Escuela Nacional de Artes Plásticas "Rafael Rodríguez Padilla" was founded in 1920 as Academia de Bellas Artes (Academy of Fine Arts) in 1920. Its current name bears the name of its founding director, Rafael Rodríguez Padilla (1890–1929).

Course offerings 
 Painting
 Sculpture
 Graphic art

Notable faculty, staff, and alumni 

Faculty and staff — current and former
 José Luis Álvarez (1917–2012), student in the 1930s, teacher from 1958 to 1986
 Rafael Rodríguez Padilla (1890–1929), co-founder and director from 1920 to 1928
 Rafael Yela Günther (1888–1942), director until 1942
 Javier Cárcamo Guzmán (born 1980), teacher
 Julio Dubois (1880–1960), student, later professor and director from 1942 to 1944
 Víctor Vásquez Kestler (1927–1994), student and lecturer

Alumni
 Ana María de Maldonado, student
 César Silva, student
 Dagoberto Vásquez, student
 Elmar René Rojas, student
 Erwin Guillermo (es), student
 Iván de León Rodríguez (es) (born 1955), student
 Jorge Mazariegos Rodríguez, student
 Manolo Gallardo (es) (born 1936), student
 Moisés Barrios, student
 Luis Rolando Ixquiac Xicara (born 1947), student
 Jorge Corleto (born 1960), teacher

References 
Faculty, staff, and alumni notes

Inline citations from tertiary sources

Inline citations from secondary sources

External links 
 
 Government of Guatemala
 Guatemala Ministry of Culture and Sports (es)
 ENAP Guatemala on Facebook

Educational institutions established in 1920
Universities and colleges in Guatemala City
Art schools in Guatemala
1920 establishments in Guatemala